Kalima (from , kalimah, "word") may refer to:

The Six Kalimas, texts to memorize to learn the fundamentals of Islam
Kalima (band), a Manchester jazz-funk band on Factory Records
Kalima!, the second album by Kalima
Kalima, a Moroccan magazine
"Kalima", a track by Elvin Jones on his 1978 album Remembrance
Kalima, an online journal of human rights founded by Sihem Bensedrine and Naziha Réjiba
 Al Kalima, a newspaper published in Libya

Kalima may also refer to:

 Kalima, a commune of Huambo Province, Angola
 Kalima, Democratic Republic of the Congo, a town in Maniema Province in the Democratic Republic of the Congo

See also
 Calima (disambiguation)
 Kali Ma (or Kali-ma), "mother Kali," a name for the Hindu goddess Kālī
 Kolyma (disambiguation)